The 2000 Falkirk West by-election was a parliamentary by-election held on 21 December 2000 for the Scottish constituency of Falkirk West.

The vacancy was caused by the resignation from the House of Commons of Dennis Canavan, the Member of Parliament (MP) for Falkirk West. Canavan had first been elected for West Stirlingshire in the October 1974 election as a Labour Party candidate, and had held that seat until its abolition in 1983. He had then won the new Falkirk West seat, and held that seat as a Labour MP until he was expelled from Labour in 1999. He then sat as an Independent until he resigned on 21 November 2000 by accepting the office of Crown Steward and Bailiff of the Manor of Northstead.

A by-election to fill the seat was held on 21 December. The Scottish National Party mounted a strong challenge, but fell 700 votes short of winning.

Results

General Election result, 1997

See also
Elections in Scotland

References

External links
Scottish Election Results 1997–present

2000 in Scotland
2000s elections in Scotland
Politics of Falkirk (council area)
2000 elections in the United Kingdom
By-elections to the Parliament of the United Kingdom in Scottish constituencies